Jean-Jacques Yemweni (born 4 April 1976) is a  retired Congolese footballer.

Yemweni had a brief spell with FC Sion in the Swiss Super League.

References

External links

1976 births
Living people
Footballers from Kinshasa
Democratic Republic of the Congo footballers
Democratic Republic of the Congo expatriate footballers
Democratic Republic of the Congo international footballers
FC Sion players
Daring Club Motema Pembe players
TP Mazembe players
Al-Hilal Club (Omdurman) players
G.D. Sagrada Esperança players
Expatriate footballers in Sudan
Expatriate footballers in Switzerland
Expatriate footballers in Angola
2000 African Cup of Nations players
Association football forwards
21st-century Democratic Republic of the Congo people